Michael J. Fitzpatrick is an American diplomat who has served as the United States Ambassador to Ecuador since 2019.

Early life and education 
Fitzpatrick earned a Bachelor of Arts from Georgetown University and an Master of International Affairs from Columbia University.

Career 
Fitzpatrick is a career member of the Senior Foreign Service, class of Minister-Counselor. He has served as an American diplomat since 1988. His career has spanned seven tours at U.S. Missions overseas and in senior leadership positions at the Department of State, including as the interim U.S. Permanent Representative to the Organization of American States, Deputy Chief of Mission and Chargé d'Affaires at the U.S. Embassy in Lima, Peru, Foreign Policy Advisor to a four-star member of the Joint Chiefs of Staff, and Deputy Chief of Mission and Chargé d'Affaires at the U.S. Embassy in Asuncion, Paraguay as well as a Deputy Assistant Secretary for Western Hemisphere Affairs. He began his government service in 1986, as a Presidential Management Fellow in the State Department's Office of Policy Planning and Coordination in the Bureau of Western Hemisphere Affairs.

On August 16, 2018, President Donald Trump announced his intent to nominate Fitzpatrick to be the next United States Ambassador to Ecuador. On May 23, 2019 his nomination was confirmed by voice vote in the United States Senate. He presented his credentials to President Lenín Moreno on July 3, 2019.

Awards 
He is the recipient of 17 notable State Department awards, including the Director General's Award for Reporting and Analysis. He is also a recipient of the W. Averell Harriman Award from the American Foreign Service Association.

Personal life 
Fitzpatrick speaks Spanish and French.

See also
List of ambassadors of the United States

References

Living people
Date of birth missing (living people)
Place of birth missing (living people)
20th-century American diplomats
21st-century American diplomats
Ambassadors of the United States to Ecuador
School of International and Public Affairs, Columbia University alumni
Georgetown University alumni
United States Assistant Secretaries of State
United States Foreign Service personnel
Year of birth missing (living people)